Izumi Maki may refer to:

 Izumi Maki (Nadesico), appearing in Martian Successor Nadesico
 Izumi Maki (athlete) (1968–2018), Japanese long-distance runner, winner of Nagoya Marathon 1996
 Natsumi Yanase (born 1971), aka Izumi Maki, Japanese voice actress of adult games